Bartolomeo Ruspoli and Khevenhüller-Metsch, dei principi Ruspoli (October 26, 1800 – 1872) was an Italian aristocrat, Prince of the Holy Roman Empire, son of Francesco Ruspoli, 3rd Prince of Cerveteri and second wife Leopoldina Countess von Khevenhüller-Metsch. He had four brothers, among others, Alessandro Ruspoli, 4th Prince of Cerveteri, and Camillo Ruspoli, Duke of Sueca. He was colonel of the Piedmontese army, in which he participates in the wars of the Italian resurgence. Paralyzed from below waist by the blast of a grenade, he continued to participate in wheelchair battles pushed by his assistant.

Bartolomeo is the ancestor of the Line III of the Princes Ruspoli.

His son Emanuele Ruspoli was named first prince of Poggio-Suasa after participating in the Italian unification and being the first Mayor of the Italian Rome. He was the grandfather of Donna Emanuella de Dampierre Ruspoli, Duchess of Segovia and Duchess of Anjou by her marriage to Infante Don Jaime, son of Alfonso XIII of Spain.

Emanuele is the founder of the third Ruspoli line: The Princes of Poggio-Suasa.

See also
Ruspoli

References

External links
Bartolomeo Ruspoli a genealogical site

Nobility from Rome
1800 births
1872 deaths
Military personnel from Rome